The R215 road is a regional road in Ireland which links Ardee with Dundalk in County Louth. The road was originally a section of the N52,  however it was downgraded to ease traffic and encourage use of the nearby M1 motorway. Signage on the road have yet to reflect the change.

See also 

 Roads in Ireland
 National primary road
 National secondary road

References 

Regional roads in the Republic of Ireland

Roads in County Louth